"Good Vibrations" is a song by the American rock band the Beach Boys that was composed by Brian Wilson with lyrics by Mike Love. It was released as a single on October 10, 1966 and was an immediate critical and commercial hit, topping record charts in several countries including the United States and the United Kingdom. Characterized by its complex soundscapes, episodic structure and subversions of pop music formula, it was the most expensive single ever recorded. "Good Vibrations" later became widely acclaimed as one of the finest and most important works of the rock era.

Also produced by Wilson, the title derived from his fascination with cosmic vibrations, as his mother would tell him as a child that dogs sometimes bark at people in response to their "bad vibrations". He used the concept to suggest extrasensory perception, while Love's lyrics were inspired by the nascent Flower Power movement. The song was written as it was recorded and in a similar fashion to other compositions from Wilson's Smile period. It was issued as a standalone single, backed with "Let's Go Away for Awhile", and was to be included on the never-finished album Smile. Instead, the track appeared on the September 1967 release Smiley Smile.

The making of "Good Vibrations" was unprecedented for any kind of recording. Building on his approach for Pet Sounds, Wilson recorded a surplus of short, interchangeable musical fragments with his bandmates and a host of session musicians at four different Hollywood studios from February to September 1966, a process reflected in the song's several dramatic shifts in key, texture, instrumentation and mood. Over 90 hours of tape was consumed in the sessions, with the total cost of production estimated to be in the tens of thousands of dollars. Band publicist Derek Taylor dubbed the unusual work a "pocket symphony". It helped develop the use of the studio as an instrument and heralded a wave of pop experimentation and the onset of psychedelic and progressive rock. The track featured a novel mix of instruments, including jaw harp and Electro-Theremin (also called Tannerin), and although the latter is not a true theremin, the song's success led to a renewed interest and sales of theremins and synthesizers.

"Good Vibrations" received a Grammy nomination for Best Vocal Group performance in 1966 and was inducted into the Grammy Hall of Fame in 1994. The song was voted number one in Mojos "Top 100 Records of All Time" and number six on Rolling Stones "500 Greatest Songs of All Time", and it was included in the Rock and Roll Hall of Fame's list of the "500 Songs that Shaped Rock and Roll". In later years, the song has been cited as a forerunner to the Beatles' "A Day in the Life" (1967) and Queen's "Bohemian Rhapsody" (1975). A 1976 cover version by Todd Rundgren peaked at number 34 on the Billboard Hot 100. The Beach Boys followed up "Good Vibrations" with another single pieced from sections, "Heroes and Villains" (1967), but it was less successful.

Inspiration and writing

Concept and early lyrics

The Beach Boys' leader, Brian Wilson, was responsible for the musical composition and virtually all of the arrangement for "Good Vibrations". Most of the song's structure and arrangement was written as it was recorded.  During the recording sessions for the 1966 album Pet Sounds, Wilson began changing his writing process. For "Good Vibrations", Wilson said, "I had a lot of unfinished ideas, fragments of music I called 'feels.' Each feel represented a mood or an emotion I'd felt, and I planned to fit them together like a mosaic." Engineer Chuck Britz is quoted saying that Wilson considered the song to be "his whole life performance in one track". Wilson stated: "I was an energetic 23-year-old. ... I said: 'This is going to be better than [the Phil Spector production] "You've Lost That Lovin' Feelin'.

Wilson said that "Good Vibrations" was inspired by his mother: "[She] used to tell me about vibrations. I didn't really understand too much of what it meant when I was just a boy. It scared me, the word 'vibrations.' She told me about dogs that would bark at people and then not bark at others, that a dog would pick up vibrations from these people that you can't see, but you can feel." Brian first enlisted Pet Sounds lyricist Tony Asher for help in putting words to the idea. When Brian presented the song on piano, Asher thought that it had an interesting premise with the potential for hit status, but could not fathom the end result due to Brian's primitive piano playing style. Asher remembered: 

Wilson wanted to call the song "Good Vibes", but Asher advised that it was "lightweight use of the language", and suggested that "Good Vibrations" would sound less "trendy". The two proceeded to write lyrics for the verses that were ultimately discarded.

Theremin and cello

From the start, Wilson envisioned a theremin for the track. AllMusic reviewer John Bush pointed out: "Radio listeners could easily pick up the link between the title and the obviously electronic riffs sounding in the background of the chorus, but Wilson's use of the theremin added another delicious parallel—between the single's theme and its use of an instrument the player never even touched."

"Good Vibrations" does not technically feature a theremin, but rather an Electro-Theremin, which is physically controlled by a knob on the side of the instrument. It was dubbed a "theremin" simply for convenience. At that time, theremins were most often associated with the 1945 Alfred Hitchcock film Spellbound, but their most common presence was in the theme music for the television sitcom My Favorite Martian, which ran from 1963 to 1966. Britz speculates: "He just walked in and said, 'I have this new sound for you.' I think he must have heard the sound somewhere and loved it, and built a song around it." It is unclear whether Wilson knew that the instrument was not a real theremin.

Brian credited his brother and bandmate Carl for suggesting the use of a cello on the track. He further stated that its triplet beat on the chorus was his own idea and that it was based on the Crystals' "Da Doo Ron Ron" (1963), produced by Spector. Conversely, arranger and session musician Van Dyke Parks said that it was himself who suggested having the cellist play triplets to Brian. Parks believed that having Brian exploit the cello "to such a hyperbolic degree" was what encouraged the duo to immediately collaborate on the never-finished album Smile. At some point, Wilson asked Parks to pen lyrics for "Good Vibrations", although Parks declined.

Influences and final lyrics

Wilson's cousin and bandmate Mike Love submitted the final lyrics for "Good Vibrations" and contributed its bass-baritone vocals in the chorus. He recalled that when he heard the unfinished backing track: "[It] was already so avant-garde, especially with the theremin, I wondered how our fans were going to relate to it. How's this going to go over in the Midwest or Birmingham? It was such a departure from 'Surfin' U.S.A.' or 'Help Me, Rhonda.'"

Love said that he wrote the words while on the drive to the studio. Feeling that the song could be "the Beach Boys' psychedelic anthem or flower power offering," he based the lyrics on the burgeoning psychedelic music and Flower Power movements occurring in San Francisco and some parts of the Los Angeles area. He described the lyrics as "just a flowery poem. Kind of almost like 'If you’re going to San Francisco be sure to wear flowers in your hair.'" Writing in his 1975 book The Beach Boys: Southern California Pastoral, Bruce Golden observed:

Capitol Records executives were worried that the lyrics contained psychedelic overtones, and Brian was accused of having based the song's production on his LSD experiences. Brian clarified that the song was written under the influence of marijuana, not LSD. He explained: "I made ‘Good Vibrations’ on drugs; I used drugs to make that. ... I learned how to function behind drugs, and it improved my brain ... it made me more rooted in my sanity." In Steven Gaines's 1986 biography, Wilson is quoted on the lyrics: "We talked about good vibrations with the song and the idea, and we decided on one hand that you could say ... those are sensual things. And then you'd say, 'I'm picking up good vibrations,' which is a contrast against the sensual, the extrasensory perception that we have. That's what we're really talking about."

Wilson said in 2012 that the song's "gotta keep those good vibrations" bridge was inspired by Stephen Foster. Bandmate Al Jardine compared that section to Foster and the Negro spiritual "Down by the Riverside". According to Love, the lyric "'she goes with me to a blossom world' was originally meant to be followed by the words 'we find'", but Wilson elected to cut off the line to highlight the bass track linking into the chorus.

Recording and production

Modular approach

"Good Vibrations" established a new method of operation for Wilson. Instead of working on whole songs with clear large-scale syntactical structures, Wilson limited himself to recording short interchangeable fragments (or "modules"). Through the method of tape splicing, each fragment could then be assembled into a linear sequence, allowing any number of larger structures and divergent moods to be produced at a later time. This was the same modular approach used during the sessions for Smile and Smiley Smile. To mask each tape edit, vast reverb decays were added at the mixing and sub-mixing stages.

For instrumentation, Wilson employed the services of "the Wrecking Crew", the nickname for a conglomerate of session musicians active in Los Angeles at that time. Production for "Good Vibrations" spanned more than a dozen recording sessions at four different Hollywood studios, at a time when most pop singles were typically recorded in a day or two. It was reported to have used over 90 hours of magnetic recording tape, with an eventual budget estimated in the tens of thousands, making it the costliest single recorded to that date. Biographer Peter Ames Carlin wrote that Wilson was so puzzled by the arranging of "Good Vibrations" that he would often arrive at a session, consider a few possibilities, and then leave without recording anything, which exacerbated costs.

One estimate of the overall production expenses is between $50,000 and $75,000 (equivalent to $ and $ in ), By comparison, the whole of Pet Sounds had cost $70,000 ($), itself an unusually high cost for an album.  In 2018, Wilson disputed the $50,000 figure for "Good Vibrations", saying that the overall expenses were closer to $25,000.

Contemporary advertisements reported $10,000 ($) as the track's total production costs. Domenic Priore wrote that the track cost between $10,000 and $15,000 ($). When asked in a 2005 interview if it was true that the Electro-Theremin work alone cost $100,000, Wilson replied "No. $15,000."

Development

The instrumental of the first version of the song was recorded on February 17, 1966, at Gold Star Studios and was logged as a Pet Sounds session. On that day's session log, it was given the name "#1 Untitled" or "Good, Good, Good Vibrations", but on its master tape, Wilson distinctly states: "'Good Vibrations' ... take one." After twenty-six takes, a rough mono mix completed the session. Some additional instruments and rough guide vocals were overdubbed on February 23. Brian and Carl shared vocals for this mix.

The original version of "Good Vibrations" contained the characteristics of a "funky rhythm and blues number" and would not yet resemble a "pocket symphony". There was no cello at this juncture, but the Electro-Theremin was present, played by its inventor, Paul Tanner. It was Brian's second ever recorded use of the instrument, just three days after the Pet Sounds track "I Just Wasn't Made for These Times". Brian then placed "Good Vibrations" on hold in order to devote attention to the Pet Sounds album, which saw release on May 16. More instrumental sections for "Good Vibrations" were recorded between April and June. Brian then forwent additional instrumental tracking until early September, when it was decided to revisit the song's bridge section and apply Electro-Theremin overdubs.

According to Brian's then-new friend David Anderle, during an early stage, Brian considered giving "Good Vibrations" to one of the black R&B groups signed with Warner Bros. Records such as Wilson Pickett, and then at Anderle's suggestion to singer Danny Hutton. He thought about abandoning the track, but after receiving encouragement from Anderle, eventually decided on it as the next Beach Boys single. In the meantime, he worked on writing and recording material for the group's forthcoming album, Smile.

The first Beach Boy to hear "Good Vibrations" in a semi-completed form, other than Brian, was Carl. Following a performance with the touring group in North Dakota, he remembered: "I came back up into my hotel room one night and the phone rang. It was Brian on the other end. He called me from the recording studio and played this really bizarre sounding music over the phone. There were drums smashing, that kind of stuff, and then it refined itself and got into the cello. It was a real funky track." In 1976, Brian revealed that before the final mixdown, he had been confronted with resistance by members of the group, whom Brian declined to name. The subject of their worries and complaints was the song's length and "modern" sound: "I said no, it's not going to be too long a record, it's going to be just right. ... They didn't quite understand what this jumping from studio to studio was all about. And they couldn't conceive of the record as I did. I saw the record as a totality piece."

The vocals for "Good Vibrations" were recorded at CBS Columbia Square, starting on August 24 and continuing sporadically until the very last day of assembly on September 21. The episodic structure of the composition was continuously revised as the group experimented with different ideas. Brian remembers that he began recording the "bop bop good vibrations" parts first, and that he came up with "the high parts" a week later. Mike Love recalled: "I can remember doing 25–30 vocal overdubs of the same part, and when I mean the same part, I mean same section of a record, maybe no more than two, three, four, five seconds long." Dennis Wilson was to have sung the lead vocal, but due to a bout of laryngitis, Carl replaced him at the last minute. In early September, the master tapes for "Good Vibrations" were stolen. Mysteriously, they reappeared inside Brian's home two days later.

On September 21, Brian completed the track after Tanner added a final Electro-Theremin overdub. In 1976 he elaborated on the event: "It was at Columbia. I remember I had it right in the sack. I could just feel it when I dubbed it down, made the final mix from the 16-track down to mono. It was a feeling of power, it was a rush. A feeling of exaltation. Artistic beauty. It was everything ... I remember saying, 'Oh my God. Sit back and listen to this!'"

Composition and analysis

Genre and dynamics

There are six unique sections to the piece. Music theorist Daniel Harrison refers to these sections individually as the verse, the refrain (or chorus), the "first episodic digression", the "second episodic digression", the "retro-refrain", and the coda. Each has a distinct musical texture, partly due to the nature of the song's recording. The track's instrumentation changes radically from section to section, and for the AM radio standards of late 1966, the song's final runtime (3 minutes 35 seconds) was considered a "very long" duration. Wilson is quoted in 1979:

He characterized the song as "advanced rhythm and blues". Tom Roland of American Songwriter described the piece, "with its interlocking segments—a sort of pop version of the classical sonata, consisting of a series of musical movements". New York Magazine compared it to "a fugue with a rhythmic beat". John Bush compared the track's fragmented cut-and-paste style to 1960s experimentalists such as William S. Burroughs. Music journal Sound on Sound argued that the song "has as many dramatic changes in mood as a piece of serious classical music lasting more than half an hour". It explained that the song subverts pop forms to a considerable degree: 

According to historian Lorenzo Candelaria, "Good Vibrations" has since been marketed as pop music "possibly because it comes across relatively innocent compared with the hard-edged rock we have since come to know."  Uncut called the song "three minutes and thirty-six seconds of avant-garde pop". Mixdown described it as a "masterpiece of avant-pop". The theremin and cello has been called the song's "psychedelic ingredient". In his book discussing music of the counterculture era, James Perrone stated that the song represented a type of impressionistic psychedelia, in particular for its cello playing repeated bass notes and its theremin. Professor of American history John Robert Greene named "Good Vibrations" among examples of psychedelic or acid rock. Stebbins wrote that the song was "replete with sunshine [and] psychedelia". Steve Valdez says that, like Pet Sounds, Brian was attempting a more experimental rock style.

Comparing "Good Vibrations" to Wilson's previous work Pet Sounds, biographer Andrew Hickey said that the "best way of thinking about [the song] is that it's taking the lowest common denominator of 'Here Today' and 'God Only Knows' and turned the result into an R&B track. We have the same minor-key change between verse and chorus we've seen throughout Pet Sounds, the same descending scalar chord sequences, the same mobile bass parts, but here, rather than to express melancholy, these things are used in a way that's as close as Brian Wilson ever got to funky." Author Jon Stebbins adds that "unlike Pet Sounds the chorus of 'Good Vibrations' projects a definite 'rock and roll' energy and feel."

According to academic Rikky Rooksby, "Good Vibrations" is an example of Brian Wilson's growing interest in musical development within a composition, something antithetical to popular music of the time. Suppressing tonic strength and cadential drive, the song makes use of descending harmonic motions through scale degrees controlled by a single tonic and "radical disjunctions" in key, texture, instrumentation, and mood while refusing to develop into a predictable formal pattern. It instead develops "under its own power" and "luxuriates in harmonic variety" exemplified by beginning and ending not only in different keys but also in different modes.

Verses and refrains (0:00–1:40)

"Good Vibrations" begins without introduction in a traditional verse/refrain format, opening with Carl Wilson singing the word "I", a triplet eighth note before the downbeat. The sparse first verse contains a repetition of chords played on a Hammond organ filtered through a Leslie speaker; underneath is a two-bar Fender bass melody. This sequence repeats once (0:15), but with the addition of two piccolos sustaining over a falling flute line. For percussion, bongo drums double the bass rhythm and every fourth-beat is struck by either a tambourine or a bass-drum-and-snare combination, in alternation. The beat projects a triplet feel despite being in  time; this is sometimes called a "shuffle beat" or "threes over fours". The chord progression used is i–VII–VI–V, also called an Andalusian cadence. Although the verses begin in the minor mode of E, the mode is not used to express sadness or drudgery. Occurring at the very end of these verses is a passing chord, D.

The refrain (0:25) begins in the newly tonicized relative major G, which suggests III. Providing a backdrop to the Electro-Theremin is a cello and string bass playing a bowed tremolo triplet, a feature that was an exceedingly rare effect in pop music. The Fender bass is steady at one note per beat while tom drums and tambourine provide a backbeat. This time, the rhythm is stable, and is split into four 4-bar sections which gradually build its vocals. The first section consists of only the couplet "I'm picking up good vibrations/she's giving me the excitation" sung by Mike Love in his bass-baritone register; the second repeats the lines and adds an "ooo bop bop" figure, sung in multiple-part harmony; the third time also adds a "good, good, good, good vibrations" in yet a higher harmony. This type of polyphony (counterpoint) is also rare in contemporary popular styles.  Each repeat of the vocal lines also transposes up by a whole step, ascending from G to A and then B. It then returns to the verse, thus making a perfect cadence back into E minor.  The verse and refrain then repeat without any changes to the patterns of its instrumentation and harmony. This is unusual, in that normally, a song's arrangement adds something once it reaches the second verse.

Episodic digressions

First episode (1:41–2:13)

The first episode (1:41+) begins disjunctively with an abrupt tape splice. The refrain's B, which had received a dominant (V) charge, is now maintained as a tonic (I). There is harmonic ambiguity, in that the chord progression may be either interpreted as I–IV–I (in B) or V–I–V (in E). Stebbins says that this section "might be called a bridge under normal circumstances, but the song's structure takes such an abstract route that traditional labels don't really apply." A new sound is created by tack piano, jaw harp, and bass relegated to strong beats which is subsequently (1:55) augmented by a new electric organ, bass harmonica, and sleigh bells shaken on every beat.  The lone line of vocals (aside from non-lexical harmonies) is "I don't know where, but she sends me there" sung in Mike Love's upper-register baritone.  This section lasts for ten measures (6 + 2 + 2), which is unexpectedly long in light of previous patterns.

Second episode (2:13–2:56)

Another tape splice occurs at 2:13, transitioning to an electric organ playing sustained chords set in the key of F accompanied by a maraca shaken on every beat. Sound on Sound highlights this change as the "most savage edit in the track ... most people would go straight into a big splash hook-line section. Brian Wilson decided to slow the track even further, moving into a 23-bar section of church organ ... Most arrangers would steer clear of this kind of drop in pace, on the grounds that it would be chart suicide, but not Brian." Harrison says: 

The slowed pace is complemented by the lyric ("Gotta keep those loving good vibrations a-happening with her"), sung once first as a solo voice, with the melody repeated an octave higher the second time with an accompanying harmony. This two-part vocal fades as a solo harmonica plays a melody on top of the persistent quarter-note bass line and maraca that maintain the only rhythm throughout Episode 2. The section ends with a five-part harmony vocalizing a whole-note chord that is sustained by reverb for a further four beats. Lambert calls it the song's "wake-up chord at the end of the meditation that transports the concept into a whole new realm: it's an iconic moment among iconic moments. As it rouses us from a blissful dream and echoes into the silence leading into the chorus, it seems to capture every sound and message the song has to say."

Retro-refrain and coda (2:57–3:35)

A brief break at the end of the second musical digression creates tension which leads into the final sequence of the song.  The refrain reappears for an additional five measures, marching through a transpositional structure that begins in B, repeats at A, and then ends at G for an unexpectedly short single measure.  The section uses a descending progression, which mirrors the ascending progression of the previous two refrains.  There follows a short section of vocalizing in three-part counterpoint that references the original refrain by reproducing upward transposition. However, this time it settles on A, the concluding key of the song. By the end of "Good Vibrations," all seven scale degrees of the opening E-minor tonic are activated on some level.

Release and promotion

In a July 1966 advertisement for Pet Sounds in Billboard magazine, the band thanked the music industry for the sales of their album, and said that "We're moved over the fact that our Pet Sounds brought on nothing but Good Vibrations." This was the first public hint of the new single. Later in the year, Brian told journalist Tom Nolan that the new Beach Boys single was "about a guy who picks up good vibrations from a girl" and that it would be a "monster". He then suggested: "It's still sticking pretty close to that same boy-girl thing, you know, but with a difference. And it's a start, it's definitely a start." Derek Taylor, who had recently been engaged as the band's publicist, is credited for coining the term a "pocket symphony" to describe the song. In a press release for the single, he stated: "Wilson's instinctive talents for mixing sounds could most nearly equate to those of the old painters whose special secret was in the blending of their oils. And what is most amazing about all outstanding creative artists is that they are using only those basic materials which are freely available to everyone else."

To promote the single, four different music videos were shot. The first of these—which had Caleb Deschanel as cameraman—features the group at a fire station, sliding down its pole, and roaming the streets of Los Angeles in a fashion comparable to The Monkees. The second features the group during vocal rehearsals at United Western Recorders. The third contains footage recorded during the making of The Beach Boys in London, a documentary by Peter Whitehead of their concert performances. The fourth clip is an alternative edit of the third. Brian also made a rare television appearance on local station KHJ-TV for its Teen Rock and Roll Dance Program, introducing the song to the show's in-studio audience and presenting an exclusive preview of the completed record.

On October 15, 1966, Billboard predicted that the single would reach the top 20 in the Billboard Hot 100 chart. "Good Vibrations" was the Beach Boys' third US number one hit, after "I Get Around" and "Help Me, Rhonda", reaching the top of the Hot 100 in December. It was also their first number one in Britain. The single sold over 230,000 copies in the US within four days of its release and entered the Cash Box chart at number 61 on October 22. In the UK, the song sold over 50,000 copies in the first 15 days of its release. "Good Vibrations" quickly became the Beach Boys' first million-selling single. In December 1966, the record was their first single certified gold by the RIAA for sales of one million copies. On March 30, 2016, the digital single was certified platinum by the RIAA for the same sales level.

In the US, Cash Box said that it is a "catchy, easy-driving ditty loaded with the Boys’ money-making sound."  In Britain, the single received favorable reviews from the New Musical Express and Melody Maker. Soon after, the Beach Boys were voted the number one band in the world in the NME readers' poll, ahead of the Beatles, the Walker Brothers, the Rolling Stones, and the Four Tops. Billboard said that this result was probably influenced by the success of "Good Vibrations" when the votes were cast, together with the band's recent tour, whereas the Beatles had neither a recent single nor had they toured the UK throughout 1966; the reporter added that "The sensational success of the Beach Boys, however, is being taken as a portent that the popularity of the top British groups of the last three years is past its peak." In a readers' poll conducted by a Danish newspaper, Brian Wilson won the "best foreign-produced recording award", marking the first time that an American had won in that category.

The single achieved sales of over 50,000 copies in Australia, being eligible for the award of a Gold Disc.

Influence and legacy

Historical reception

Virtually every pop music critic recognizes "Good Vibrations" as one of the most important compositions and recordings of the entire rock era. It is a regular fixture on "greatest of all-time" song lists and is frequently hailed as one of the finest pop productions of all time. In 2004 and 2010, Rolling Stone magazine ranked "Good Vibrations" at number 6 in "The 500 Greatest Songs of All Time", the highest position of seven Beach Boys songs cited in the list. In 2001, the song was voted 24th in the RIAA and NEA's Songs of the Century list. As of 2016, "Good Vibrations" is ranked as the number four song of all time in an aggregation of critics' lists at Acclaimed Music. The Guardian and Paste both ranked the song number one on their lists of the greatest Beach Boys songs.

The song served as an anthem for the counterculture of the 1960s. According to Noel Murray of The A.V. Club, it also helped turn around the initially poor perception of Pet Sounds in the US, where the album's "un-hip orchestrations and pervasive sadness [had] baffled some longtime fans, who didn't immediately get what Wilson was trying to do." Encouraged by the single's success, Wilson continued working on Smile, intending it as an entire album incorporating the writing and production techniques he had devised for "Good Vibrations". "Heroes and Villains", the Beach Boys' follow-up single, continued his modular recording practices, spanning nearly thirty recording sessions held between May 1966 and June 1967.

In contrast to the acclaim lavished on the song, some of Wilson's pop and rock contemporaries have been tempered in their praise of "Good Vibrations". When asked about the song in 1990, Paul McCartney responded: "I thought it was a great record. It didn't quite have the emotional thing that Pet Sounds had for me. I've often played Pet Sounds and cried. It's that kind of an album for me." Pete Townshend of the Who was quoted in the 1960s as saying, "'Good Vibrations' was probably a good record but who's to know? You had to play it about 90 bloody times to even hear what they were singing about." Townshend feared that the single would lead to a trend of overproduction. In a 1966 issue of Arts Magazine, Jonathan King said: "With justification, comments are being passed that 'Good Vibrations' is an inhuman work of art. Computerized pop, mechanized music. Take a machine, feed in various musical instruments, add a catch phrase, stir well, and press seven buttons. It is long and split. ... impressive, fantastic, commercial—yes. Emotional, soul-destroying, shattering—no." In the 2000s, record producer Phil Spector criticized the single for depending too much on tape manipulation, negatively referring to it as an "edit record ... It's like Psycho is a great film, but it's an 'edit film.' Without edits, it's not a film; with edits, it's a great film. But it's not Rebecca ... it's not a beautiful story."

Advancements

Recording and popular music

"Good Vibrations" is credited for having further developed the use of recording studios as a musical instrument. Author Domenic Priore commented that the song's making was "unlike anything previous in the realms of classical, jazz, international, soundtrack, or any other kind of recording". A milestone in the development of rock music, the song, together with the Beatles' Revolver, was a prime proponent in rock's transformation from live concert performances to studio productions that could only exist on record. Musicologist Charlie Gillett called it "one of the first records to flaunt studio production as a quality in its own right, rather than as a means of presenting a performance". In a 1968 editorial for Jazz & Pop, Gene Sculatti predicted:

Writing for Popmatters in 2015, Scott Interrante stated: "'Good Vibrations' changed the way a pop record could be made, the way a pop record could sound, and the lyrics a pop record could have." The recording contains previously untried mixes of instruments, and it was the first pop hit to have cellos in a juddering rhythm. Microtonal composer Frank Oteri said that it "sounds like no other pop song recorded up to that point". According to Stebbins: "This signature sound would be duplicated, cloned, commercialized, and re-fabricated in songs, commercials, TV shows, movies, and elevators to the point of completely diluting the genius of the original. But 'Good Vibrations' was probably the quintessential 'sunshine pop' recording of the century." He added that the single "vaulted nearly every other rock act in their delivery of a Flower Power classic. It was just strange enough to be taken seriously, but still vibrant, happy, accessibly Beach Boys-esque pop." John Bush wrote that the single "announced the coming era of pop experimentation with a rush of riff changes, echo-chamber effects, and intricate harmonies". Gillett noted: "For the rest of the sixties, countless musicians and groups attempted to represent an equivalently blissful state, but none of them ever applied the intense discipline and concentration that Wilson had devoted to the recording."

Priore says that the song was a forerunner to works such as Marvin Gaye's What's Going On (1971) and Isaac Hayes' Shaft (1971) which presented soul music in a similar, multi-textured context imbued with ethereal sonic landscapes. In his appraisal for American Songwriter, Roland cites the song's "format" as the model for recordings by Wings ("Band on the Run"), the Beatles ("A Day in the Life"), and Elton John ("Funeral for a Friend/Love Lies Bleeding"). The song's approach was repeated in Queen's 1975 single "Bohemian Rhapsody", which was similarly pieced together using different sections. Wilson praised Queen's effort, calling it "the most competitive thing that's come along in ages" and "a fulfillment and an answer to a teenage prayer—of artistic music".

Psychedelic and progressive rock

With "Good Vibrations", the Beach Boys ended 1966 as the only band besides the Beatles to have had a high-charting psychedelic rock song, at a time when the genre was still in its formative stages. Writing in 2009, Barney Hoskyns deemed it to be the era's "ultimate psychedelic pop record" from Los Angeles. Interrante adds: "Its influence on the ensuing psychedelic and progressive rock movements can’t be overstated, but its legacy as a pop hit is impressive as well." Former Atlantic Records executive Phillip Rauls recalled: "I was in the music business at the time, and my very first recognition of acid rock—we didn't call it progressive rock then—was, of all people, the Beach Boys and the song 'Good Vibrations' ... That [theremin] sent so many musicians back to the studio to create this music on acid." Author Bill Martin suggested that the Beach Boys were clearing a pathway toward the development of progressive rock, writing: "The fact is, the same reasons why much progressive rock is difficult to dance to apply just as much to 'Good Vibrations' and 'A Day in the Life.'"

Use of theremin

Although the song does not technically contain a theremin, "Good Vibrations" is the most frequently cited example of the instrument's use in pop music. Upon release, the single prompted an unexpected revival in theremins and increased the awareness of analog synthesizers. The notion that "Good Vibrations" features a theremin has been erroneously repeated in books, CD liner notes, and quotes from the recording's participants. While having a similar sound, a theremin is an aerial-controlled instrument, unlike the Electro-Theremin.

When the Beach Boys needed to reproduce its sound onstage, Wilson first requested that Tanner play the Electro-Theremin live with the group, but he declined due to commitments. Tanner recalls saying to Wilson, "I've got the wrong sort of hair to be on stage with you fellas", to which Wilson replied: "We'll give you a Prince Valiant wig." The Beach Boys then requested the services of Walter Sear, who asked Bob Moog to design a ribbon controller, since the group was used to playing the fretboards of a guitar. Sear remembers marking fretboard-like lines on the ribbon "so they could play the damn thing." Moog began manufacturing his own models of theremins. He later noted: "The pop record scene cleaned us out of our stock which we expected to last through Christmas."

In Steven M. Martin's 1993 documentary Theremin: An Electronic Odyssey, in which Wilson makes an appearance, it was revealed that the attention being paid to the theremin due to "Good Vibrations" caused Russian authorities to exile its inventor, Leon Theremin.

Cover versions

The song has been covered by artists such as Groove Holmes, the Troggs, Charlie McCoy, and Psychic TV. John Bush commented: "'Good Vibrations' was rarely reprised by other acts, even during the cover-happy '60s. Its fragmented style made it essentially cover-proof." In 1976, a nearly identical cover version was released as a single by Todd Rundgren for his album Faithful. When asked for his opinion, Brian said: "Oh, he did a marvelous job, he did a great job. I was very proud of his version." Rundgren's single peaked at number 34 on the Billboard Hot 100. Rundgren explained: "I used to like the sound of the Beach Boys, but it wasn't until they began to compete with the Beatles that I felt that what they were doing was really interesting—like around Pet Sounds and 'Good Vibrations' ... when they started to shed that whole surf music kind of burden and start to branch out into something that was a little more universal. ...  I tried to do [the song] as literally as I could because in the intervening 10 years, radio had changed so much. Radio had become so formatted and so structured that that whole experience was already gone."

In 2004, Wilson re-recorded the song as a solo artist for his album Brian Wilson Presents Smile. It was sequenced as the album's closing track, following "In Blue Hawaii". In this version, "Good Vibrations" was the project's only track that eschewed the modular recording method. The song's verses and chorus were recorded as part of one whole take, and were not spliced together.

In 2012, Wilson Phillips, a trio consisting of Wilson's daughters Carnie and Wendy, and John Phillips' daughter Chynna, released an album containing covers of songs by the Beach Boys and the Mamas & the Papas titled Dedicated. Their version of "Good Vibrations", with Carnie Wilson on lead vocals, was released as a single from the album and peaked at number 25 on Billboards A/C chart.

In popular culture
In 1996, experimental rock group His Name Is Alive released an homage titled "Universal Frequencies" on their album Stars on E.S.P. Warren Defever reportedly listened to "Good Vibrations" repeatedly for a week before deciding that the song "needed a sequel"; he added: "'Good Vibrations' is one of the first pop hits where you can actually hear the tape edits and I think that's wonderful." 
The song's lyrics "I'm picking up good vibrations" are quoted in Cyndi Lauper's 1984 single "She Bop". 
In 2001, the song was used prominently in a scene with Tom Cruise, Tilda Swinton, and Kurt Russell in the psychological thriller Vanilla Sky 
A live version of the song, from the album Live in London, appears as a playable track in the 2010 video game Rock Band 3.
In 2019, the song was used prominently in a scene for Jordan Peele's psychological horror thriller film Us.

Release history

In early 2011, the single was remastered and reissued as a four-sided 78 rpm vinyl for Record Store Day, as a teaser for the forthcoming The Smile Sessions box set. It contained "Heroes and Villains" as a B-side, along with previously released alternate takes and mixes.

Stereo version
Due to the loss of the original multi-track tape, there had never been an official true stereo release of the final track until the 2012 remastered version of Smiley Smile. The stereo mix was made possible through the invention of new digital technology by Derry Fitzgerald, and received the blessing of Brian Wilson and Mark Linett. Fitzgerald's software extracted individual instrumental and vocal stems from the original mono master—as the multi-track vocals remained missing—to construct the stereo version that appears on the 2012 reissue of Smiley Smile.

40th Anniversary Edition

In celebration of its 40th year, the Good Vibrations: 40th Anniversary Edition EP was released. The EP includes "Good Vibrations", four alternate versions of the song, and the stereo mix of "Let's Go Away for Awhile". The EP artwork recreates that of the original 7-inch single sleeve. In 2016, the EP was reissued as a 12" record for the single's 50th anniversary.

Personnel

The details in this section are adapted from The Smile Sessions liner notes, which includes a sessionography compiled by band archivist Craig Slowinski, and the website Bellagio 10452, maintained by music historian Andrew G. Doe.

Single edit

The Beach Boys
 Al Jardine – backing vocals
 Bruce Johnston – backing vocals
 Mike Love – lead and backing vocals
 Brian Wilson – lead and backing vocals, tack piano (choruses), overdubbed tambourine (choruses)
 Carl Wilson – lead and backing vocals, electric rhythm guitar (choruses and chorus fade), shaker (second bridge)
 Dennis Wilson – backing vocals, Hammond organ (second bridge)

Additional players

 Hal Blaine – drums (verses and choruses), timpani (choruses), shaker (second bridge)
 Jimmy Bond – upright bass (first bridge)
 Frank Capp – bongos with sticks
 Gary Coleman – sleigh bells (third bridge and chorus fade)
 Steve Douglas – tenor flute (verses and first bridge)
 Jesse Ehrlich – cello
 Jim Gordon – drums (third bridge and chorus fade)
 Bill Green – contra-clarinet, bass saxophone
 Jim Horn – piccolo (first bridge)

 Larry Knechtel – Hammond organ (verses)
 Plas Johnson – piccolo (verses and chorus fade), flutes (chorus fade)
 Al De Lory – tack piano
 Mike Melvoin – upright piano (chorus fade)
 Jay Migliori  – flutes (verses and chorus fade)
 Tommy Morgan – bass harmonica, overdubbed jaw harp, harmonica
 Bill Pitman – Danelectro bass (first bridge, third bridge, and chorus fade)
 Ray Pohlman – Fender bass (verses and first bridge)
 Don Randi – electric harpsichord
 Lyle Ritz – upright bass (verses and second bridge), Fender bass (choruses)
 Paul Tanner – Electro-Theremin
 Terry (surname unknown, possibly Terry Melcher) – tambourine (verses)
 Arthur Wright – Fender bass (third bridge and chorus fade)
 unknown (possibly Hal Blaine) – tambourine (first bridge)

Technical staff
 Chuck Britz – engineer
 Cal Harris – engineer
 Jim Lockert – engineer

Partial sessionography

 February 17 – Gold Star (this session produced the verses heard in the final master)
 Hal Blaine – drums
 Frank Capp – bongos with sticks (cups instead of bongos on some takes)
 Al Casey – electric rhythm guitar
 Steve Douglas – tenor flute
 Bill Green – contra-clarinet
 Larry Knechtel – Hammond organ
 Plas Johnson – piccolo
 Jay Migliori  – flute (verses and first bridge)
 Ray Pohlman – Fender bass (fuzz bass in chorus)
 Don Randi – grand piano (piano with taped strings on earlier takes)
 Lyle Ritz – upright bass
 Billy Strange – 12-string electric rhythm guitar (lead on earlier takes)
 Paul Tanner – Electro-Theremin
 Terry (surname unknown, possibly Terry Melcher) – tambourine
 Tony (surname unknown, possibly Tony Asher) – sleigh bells

 March 3 – Gold Star (discarded overdubs recorded on February 17 backing track)
 Brian Wilson – vocals
 Carl Wilson – vocals
 unknown (possibly Carl Wilson) – Fender bass (choruses)
 unknown (possibly Tony Asher) – jaw harp

 April 9 – Gold Star (discarded alternate version)
 Hal Blaine – drums
 Frank Capp – bongos with sticks
 Steve Douglas – tenor flute
 Carl Fortina – accordion
 Bill Green – contra-clarinet
 Carol Kaye – 12-string electric guitar
 Larry Knechtel – Hammond organ
 Al de Lory – piano with taped strings
 Mike Melvoin – tack piano
 Jay Migliori  – flute
 Tommy Morgan – bass harmonica
 Ray Pohlman – Fender bass (fuzz bass in chorus)
 Lyle Ritz – upright bass
 Arthur C. Smith – piccolo, ocarina
 Paul Tanner – Electro-Theremin

 May 4 – Western ["First Chorus", "Second Chorus", and "Fade"] (this session produced the first bridge heard in the final master)
 Jimmy Bond – upright bass
 Frank Capp – bongos with sticks, tambourine, overdubbed sleigh bells
 Al Casey – electric guitar
 Jerry Cole – electric guitar
 Jim Gordon – overdubbed sleigh bells
 Bill Green – bass saxophone
 Jim Horn – piccolo
 Al de Lory – tack pianos (including overdub)
 Tommy Morgan – bass harmonica, overdubbed jaw harp
 Ray Pohlman – Fender bass
 Bill Pitman – Danelectro bass (with fuzz tone)
 Paul Tanner – Electro-Theremin
 unknown (possibly Hal Blaine) – tambourine

 May 24 – Sunset Sound ["Part 1", "Part 2", "Part 3", and "Part 4"] (discarded bridge and choruses)
 Gary Coleman – castanets, sleigh bells, clavs
 Steve Douglas – tambourine
 Jim Gordon – drums, timpani
 Bill Green – alto flute
 Jim Horn – flute, piccolo (bridge)
 Carol Kaye – Danelectro bass
 Al de Lory – pianos with taped strings (including overdub)
 Jay Migliori  – flute (bridge), kazoos (including overdub)
 Lyle Ritz – upright bass
 Paul Tanner – Electro-Theremin
 Carl Wilson – Fender bass

 May 25 – Sunset Sound ["Part 1", "Part 2", "Part 3", and "Part 4"] (discarded overdubs recorded on May 24 backing tracks)
 Arthur "Skeets" Herfurt – clarinet
 Jim Horn – piccolo
 Abe Most – clarinet

 May 27 – Western ["Part C", "Chorus", and "Fade Sequence"] (this session produced the third bridge and chorus fade heard in the final master)
 Gary Coleman – timpanis ("Part C"), sleigh bells ("Chorus")
 Steve Douglas – tambourine
 Jim Gordon – drums
 Jim Horn – piccolos, flutes
 Plas Johnson – piccolos, flutes
 Mike Melvoin – upright piano, overdubbed piano with taped strings
 Bill Pitman – Danelectro bass (including fuzz tone)
 Emil Richards – overdubbed vibraphones
 Lyle Ritz – upright bass (arco in "Part C")
 Paul Tanner – Electro-Theremin
 Carl Wilson – electric rhythm guitar (chorus fade)
 Arthur Wright – Fender bass

 June 2 – Western ["Inspiration"] (this session produced the first, second and third choruses heard in the final master, as well as a discarded bridge)
 Hal Blaine – drums, overdubbed tambourine (bridge), timpani, cups (bridge)
 Bill Pitman – Danelectro bass (with fuzz tone)
 Don Randi – electric harpsichord
 Lyle Ritz – Fender bass
 Brian Wilson – tack piano (choruses), overdubbed tambourine (choruses)
 Carl Wilson – electric rhythm guitar

 June 12 – Western ["Inspiration"] (overdubs recorded on June 2 backing tracks)
 Hal Blaine – tambourine (bridge)
 Jesse Ehrlich – cello (choruses)
 Paul Tanner – Electro-Theremin (bridge)

 June 16 – Western ["Part 1", "Part 2", "Verse", and "Part 3"] (discarded alternate verse, chorus, and bridge)
 Hal Blaine – overdubbed drums ("Part 1"), drums with sticks ("Part 2")
 Steve Douglas – grand piano, overdubbed soprano saxophone ("Part 1" and "Part 2")
 Jim Horn – overdubbed clarinet ("Part 1" and "Part 2")
 Al de Lory – electric harpsichord
 Mike Melvoin – Hammond organ
 Jay Migliori  – overdubbed bass clarinet ("Part 1" and "Part 2")
 Tommy Morgan – overdubbed bass harmonica ("Part 1"), overdubbed harmonica ("Part 2")
 Bill Pitman – Danelectro bass (with fuzz tone in chorus and bridge)
 Lyle Ritz – upright bass
 Paul Tanner – Electro-Theremin
 Carl Wilson – Fender bass
 unknown (possibly Brian Wilson) – tambourine ("Part 1")

 June 18 – Western ["Part 1" and "Part 2"] (as above)
 Bill Green  – clarinet
 Plas Johnson  – clarinet
 Carol Kaye – Fender bass
 Al de Lory – tack piano ("Part 1"), Hammond organ ("Part 2")
 Jay Migliori  – clarinet
 Tommy Morgan – bass harmonica ("Part 1"), harmonica ("Part 2")
 Bill Pitman – Danelectro bass (with fuzz tone in bridge)
 Paul Tanner – Electro-Theremin
 Brian Wilson – upright bass
 Carl Wilson – electric guitar

  – Columbia (two vocal sessions; incomplete documentation due to missing tape)
 Dennis Wilson – lead vocal

 September 1 – Western ["Inspiration" and "Persuasion"] (this session produced the second bridge heard in the final master)
 Hal Blaine – shaker
 Tommy Morgan – harmonica, overdubbed bass harmonica
 Lyle Ritz – upright bass
 Carl Wilson – shaker
 Dennis Wilson – Hammond organ

 September 12 – Columbia (this session produced part of the vocals heard in the final master)
 Al Jardine – backing vocals
 Bruce Johnston – backing vocals
 Mike Love – lead and backing vocals
 Brian Wilson – lead and backing vocals
 Carl Wilson – lead and backing vocals
 Dennis Wilson – backing vocals

 September 21 – Columbia (this session produced part of the vocals and part of the Electro-Theremin heard in the final master)
 Al Jardine – backing vocals
 Bruce Johnston – backing vocals
 Mike Love – lead and backing vocals
 Paul Tanner – Electro-Theremin
 Brian Wilson – lead and backing vocals
 Carl Wilson – lead and backing vocals
 Dennis Wilson – backing vocals

Charts

Weekly charts
Original release

1976 reissue

Todd Rundgren version (1976)

Year-end charts

Certifications

Awards and accolades

Notes

References

Bibliography

External links

 Greg Panfile's Musical Analysis of "Good Vibrations" 
 

1966 singles
1966 songs
2004 singles
2011 singles
Brian Wilson songs
Psychic TV songs
The Beach Boys songs
Todd Rundgren songs
Capitol Records singles
Grammy Hall of Fame Award recipients
Billboard Hot 100 number-one singles
Cashbox number-one singles
Number-one singles in Australia
Number-one singles in New Zealand
UK Singles Chart number-one singles
Songs written by Brian Wilson
Songs written by Mike Love
Songs written by Tony Asher
Song recordings produced by Brian Wilson
Song recordings with Wall of Sound arrangements
Acid rock songs
Art pop songs
Avant-pop songs
Psychedelic pop songs
American psychedelic rock songs
American rhythm and blues songs
Songs used as jingles